Mortadelo and Filemon: Mission Implausible ("Mortadelo and Filemon versus Jimmy the Joker") is a 2014 Spanish 3D computer-animated comedy co-written, directed and edited by Javier Fesser based on the characters from the Mort & Phil comic book series. It achieved six nominations for the 29th Goya Awards, winning in the Best Adapted Screenplay and Best Animated Film categories, and two for the second edition of Premios Feroz.

Plot
After installing his 30th Vault, Super, the head of the spy agency called "T.I.A" (a play on the name C.I.A, also a spy agency) receives a message from Jimmy "The Crazy" The agency's main enemy successfully steals the vault, Super calls the unlucky Phil and his sidekick Mort (After the first one had a dream where he was respected and admired by everyone), when he discovers that a guy he held in jail named Tronchamulas (Trunkmules) 

has escaped, and thirsty with rage to apply the technique of "El aquello" (turn the victim inside out).

At the agency, a furious Tronchamulas ends up being sedated by Professor Bacterio's invention, called Reversiccina, which totally changes his angry and intimidating appearance to a kind and polite person,super orders that Phil and Mort take Tronchamulas to a witness protection program, after a chase across town for a Tronchamulas in a runaway baby stroller, the trio stop at a reality show, where accidentally a Tronchamulas Reversiccinaded speaks the whole Super's plan in front of 200 million viewers.

Jimmy, outraged by his cousin saying he knows where his hiding place is, destroys the T.I.A. HQ roof, Super orders Mort and Phil again to take Tronchamulas to their house, taking advantage that Tronchamulas is disoriented by reversiccina, they force him to do housework, such as darning, ironing, washing and cooking. Phil provokes Tronchamulas by joking about the fact that his father didn't want him, so Tronchamulas threatens Phil who, despite being reversicinated, can still do "El aquello" on him. Above them, an angry Jimmy and his henchmen attempt to destroy the building his cousin was in, hilariously failing.On the ground floor of the apartment where they were staying, Tronchamulas finds a little old man, half blind, thinks that Tronchamulas is a child and decides to take him to the police station, when the effect of Reversiccina wears off, Tronchamulas takes the wheel and goes to the hideout from his cousin to alert him that he is wanted.

Convinced that Tronchamulas was kidnapped by Jimmy, Phil and Mort decide to go rescue him, Jimmy intends to destroy the T.I.A once and for all with a missile, after seeing that the duo "destroyed" his hiding place. Tronchamulas using a crane, catches the duo on a"homemade plane", very similar to Phil's dream, he launches both towards Jimmy, that was heading towards T.I.A with the missile, an intense aerial battle takes place to prevent the destruction of the HQ, however, in an act of distraction, Phil unintentionally releases the missile he was holding, hitting the T.I.A and literally throwing her through the air.

Tronchamulas appears again with a dog catcher car, following Jimmy's helicopter in search of the little old man. When Phil teases him that he forgot his shoes with him, growling and huffing, he finally does the "El aquello" technique. When he finally prevents the little old man from having a bad fall, Tronchamulas assumes he wants to change his life and they head off into the sun, Jimmy annoyed at having his plan go down the drain, decides to blow them both up after pressing a button that transforms his helicopter, despite all detonated,seeing that the duo still was mocking him, Jimmy threatens to throw a bomb towards the duo, they try to buy time talking to Jimmy, which doesn't work and causes Jimmy to press the button, hilariously, the T.I.A HQ literally falls on him, brutally crushing him.

After retrieving the envelope for Super, who was in the hospital, Phil and Mort are outraged to learn that what was inside was just a simple sweet potato puree recipe,after Mort and Phil literally force Super to swallow his vault, Super is searching for both of them with a fishing spear in Antarctica, while both are in disguise, waiting for the problems get "cold".

In a post opening credits scene, it is seen that Phil used the last dose of Reversiccina to make a woman in the T.I.A. HQ fall in love with him.

Characters 
The portrayal of the characters is rather faithful to the comics except for Mortadelo and Filemon: Mortadelo has far more common sense and Filemon is actually quite dumb while in the comics, it was the opposite

The T.I.A. Staff 
Mortadelo: The Subordinate of Filemon and Super. Despite being a bit clumsy, he's rather cunning, resourceful and has invented several gadgets on his own to protect his apartment. He has incredible skill in disguising himself as virtually anything ranging from animals to professionals outfits, machinery etc...Like everyone else, he cares very little about his boss and has often prove that he might be actually more competent than Filemon.

Filemón: The Boss of Mortadelo. Initially presentend as the "Straight-Man" to Mortadelo's "Ditz" in the comics, his portrayal into the movies is different: extremely stupid, arrogant, cowardly, bossy and incompetent, he's also incredibly accident-prone, capable of being injured in comical and painful ways.

He spent most of his time dreaming that he's a great hero but is despised by everyone and tries to avoid vengeful foes who he has arrested in the past.

Voice cast in Spanish

Box office
The film's production budget is estimated at $12.5 million. In Spain, the film grossed €4.9 million ($5.5 million).

Awards and nominations

References

External links
 
 

2014 films
2014 3D films
2014 comedy films
2014 computer-animated films
2010s children's comedy films
2010s children's animated films
2010s spy comedy films
2010s Spanish-language films
Spanish 3D films
Spanish computer-animated films
Spanish children's films
Spanish spy comedy films
Mort & Phil
3D animated films
Animated films based on comics
Films based on Spanish comics
Warner Bros. films
Warner Bros. animated films
Ilion Animation Studios films
2010s American films
2010s Spanish films